3Way International Logistics Inc. is a freight forwarding company located in Mississauga, Ontario, Canada near Toronto Pearson International Airport. The names derives from the way they can send their shipment by either Land, Air or Ocean. The company was founded by Florencio Mario Simao Martins in May 2001.

3Way also works on Freight services, freight forwarding, and as a cargo agent. 3Way  also has achieved international qualifications in the Member of Institute of Logistics & Transport, UK, and Fellow of Freight Professional Institute, UK. The company was the only representative from Canada to go to the 2005 China Summit.

External links
 The official website for 3Way
 2005 China Summit.

Logistics companies of Canada
Companies based in Mississauga